A by-election was held for the New South Wales Legislative Assembly electorate of The Tumut on 16 November 1863. The by-election was triggered because of the resignation of Charles Cowper Jr. James Martin had replaced Charles Cowper Sr as Premier, establishing his first ministry, and Cowper Jr. resigned his seat to successfully challenge Martin at the Orange by-election.

Dates

Result

Charles Cowper Jr. had resigned his seat to successfully challenge James Martin at the Orange by-election.

See also
Electoral results for the district of Tumut
List of New South Wales state by-elections

References

1863 elections in Australia
New South Wales state by-elections
1860s in New South Wales